Democratic Alignment (Dimokratiki Parataxi) is a centrist political party in Cyprus.

The party was created after disagreements with Democratic Party (DIKO) leader Nikolas Papadopoulos with regard to the approach the Greek Cypriot administration should take with regard to working to solve the Cyprus problem. The party was admitted into the Alliance of Liberals and Democrats for Europe (ALDE) on 18 November 2020.

Electoral results

Footnotes

Political parties established in 2018
Political parties in Cyprus